Eriogonum plumatella is a species of wild buckwheat known by the common name yucca buckwheat. It is native to the desert southwest of the United States.

Description
This is an erect shrub reaching a maximum of about 60 centimeters in height and having a narrow, nonspreading profile. Its branching inflorescence has small, woolly, oval-shaped leaves each about a centimeter long.

The top of the plant is occupied by flower clusters which sometimes appear as though arranged in horizontal layers. The flowers are generally pale yellow or white.

External links
Jepson Manual Treatment - Eriogonum plumatella
Eriogonum plumatella - Photo gallery

plumatella
Flora of Arizona
Flora of Nevada
Flora of the Sonoran Deserts
Flora of the California desert regions
Flora of the Great Basin
Flora without expected TNC conservation status